Killer Kids is a Canadian documentary series. It first premiered in 2011 on The Biography Channel and aired for an additional three seasons on LMN before cancellation.

Episodes

Season 1

Season 2 (LMN)

Season 3 (LMN)

Season 4 (LMN)

References

External links 

 

2010s American documentary television series
2010s Canadian documentary television series
True crime television series